KKHB (105.5 FM) is a radio station broadcasting a classic hits format. Licensed to Eureka, California, United States, the station serves the Eureka area. The station is currently owned by Bicoastal Media Licenses II, LLC and features programming from Jones Radio Network.

History
The station went on the air as KECU on February 16, 1988. On February 18, 1988, the station changed its call sign to KECA and on August 30, 1993, to KGOE. On August 23, 1996, the station became the current KKHB.

References

External links
Official website

KHB
Radio stations established in 1988
Classic hits radio stations in the United States
Mass media in Humboldt County, California